Jagan (also known as Jagan Bebeh Jīk and Jagan Beh Beh Jīk) is a village in Qarah Quyun-e Shomali Rural District, in the Central District of Showt County, West Azerbaijan Province, Iran. At the 2006 census, its population was 18, in 9 families.

References 

Populated places in Showt County